{{DISPLAYTITLE:C6H4N2O4}}
The molecular formula C6H4N2O4 (molar mass: 168.11 g/mol, exact mass: 168.0171 u) may refer to:

 Dinitrobenzenes
 1,2-Dinitrobenzene
 1,3-Dinitrobenzene
 1,4-Dinitrobenzene